Rugby union in Syria is a minor but growing sport. Rugby was first introduced to the country by French and British forces, as well as by Syrian expatriates returning from the diaspora.

History 

Rugby was previously played in Syria under a French mandate when it was brought to the country by Allied troops after the 1941 invasion. Documented are the matches held between New Zealand Army soldiers and local villagers.

Touch rugby was played in Damascus since 1982 after a notice had been put up in the British Council and after a Syrian student at the Council had acquired a rugby ball in Beirut. The first game comprised two Syrian teenagers, one American and one British English teacher. From this small beginning the subsequent informal club with largely the same nationalities grew quickly and enthusiastically. 

Rugby union was introduced to Syria by the French and the British in 2004, started to grow by inviting the Syrians to play and join the team to participate in region tournaments in the Middle East.

The Syrian High Rugby Committee was formed by the Syrian Sports Council in March 2012 and as the President of the Syrian Committee was appointed Ahmad Madani, although rugby has been played in the country for a longer period of time. Syrian Rugby became a member of Asia Rugby in May 2015. The SHRC was accepted as associated member of World Rugby in November 2022.

Competitions

The Syrian Rugby League Championship has been run by the General Sports Federation since 2012.

, the league comprised five teams: Zenobians (formed in 2004), IUST Palmerians (2015), AIU Alphas (2015), Victory (2012), and Titans.

See also
Syria women's national rugby sevens team
Sarah Abd Elbaki

References

External links
 Rugby in Asia, Syria page
 "Islam and Rugby" on the Rugby Readers review
 Syrians take to rugby with fierce pride (New York Times)
 Asia Rugby
 IRB page